A get-rich-quick scheme is a plan to obtain high rates of return for a small investment. The term "get rich quick" has been used to describe shady investments since at least the early 20th century.

Most schemes create an impression that participants can obtain this high rate of return with little risk, and with little skill, effort, or time. Get-rich-quick schemes often assert that wealth can be obtained by working at home. Legal and quasi-legal get-rich-quick schemes are frequently advertised on infomercials and in magazines and newspapers. Illegal schemes or scams are often advertised through spam or cold calling. Some forms of advertising for these schemes market books or compact discs about getting rich quick rather than asking participants to invest directly in a concrete scheme.

Online schemes 
Get-rich-quick schemes that operate entirely on the Internet usually promote "secret formulas" to affiliate marketing and affiliate advertising. The scheme will usually claim that it does not require any special IT or marketing skills and will provide an unrealistic timeframe in which the individual could make hundreds of thousands, if not millions of dollars.

Lotto advice as get-rich-quick
Richard Lustig, a seven-time lottery winner from the US, wrote a 2013 booklet explaining the methods to which he attributed his success which became a best-seller on Amazon.com. Finance journalist Felix Salmon characterized Lustig as "a get-rich-quick" hack.

NFTs and cryptocurrency
Since the growth in popularity of non-fungible tokens (NFTs) in the early 2020s, skeptics have accused many NFT projects of resembling get-rich-quick schemes.

See also 
 Advance-fee scam
 Envelope stuffing
 Ripoff
 HYIP
 There ain't no such thing as a free lunch
 Land banking
 The Secret

References

Bibliography 
 Leila Schneps and Coralie Colmez, Math on trial. How numbers get used and abused in the courtroom, Basic Books, 2013. . (Eighth chapter: "Math error number 8: underestimation. The case of Charles Ponzi: American dream, American scheme").

Confidence tricks
Finance fraud
Ethically disputed business practices